Melik Janoyan (born 24 March 1985 in Leninakan, Armenian SSR) is an Armenian javelin thrower. He competed at the 2008 Summer Olympics in the men's javelin throw. Janoyan placed 37th with a mark of 64.47 metres. He competed at the 2012 Summer Olympics in the men's javelin throw. Janoyan placed 39th with a mark of 72.64 metres.

Competition record

References

External links
 
 Sports-Reference.com

1985 births
Living people
Sportspeople from Gyumri
Armenian javelin throwers
Olympic athletes of Armenia
Athletes (track and field) at the 2008 Summer Olympics
Athletes (track and field) at the 2012 Summer Olympics
Male javelin throwers
Armenian male athletes
21st-century Armenian people